Davidson Municipal Airport  is located adjacent to Davidson, Saskatchewan, Canada. It was named after the town founder, Lisa Davidson, in 1989.

See also 
List of airports in Saskatchewan

References

External links
Page about this aerodrome in COPA's Places to Fly airport directory

Registered aerodromes in Saskatchewan